The Special Operations Forces Grouping (AFOE) is a special operations unit of the Argentine Army.

Role

Created 6 December 2005 as the first operational element of the Argentine Army Project 2025.

The service is mainly composite of air assault, airborne, light infantry, reconnaissance and commando troops, and light helicopters; also artillery, engineers, air transport, and communications companies are constantly ready to assist and support the group. As of 2006 it consists of:

Special Operations Forces Group:

601 Commando Company (Spanish: Compañía de Comandos 601) is a special operations unit of the Argentine Army, created 5 January 1982.
602 Commando Company (Spanish: Compañía de Comandos 602) is a special operations unit of the Argentine Army, created 21 May 1982. They fought in the Falklands War.
601 Air Assault Regiment (Spanish: Regimiento de Asalto Aéreo 601) is a special operations unit of the Argentine Army, created in January 2003. The regiment is divided in three assault companies: A, B and C. Its motto is "Sapientia et Labore".

One of the objectives of the modernization process for the Argentine Army was to manage an enabled force that could move quickly to any crisis.

According to the Argentine Army website (translated):

The FDR will be organized, equipped and instructed with organic means of the Army to operate to requirement, in immediate form in any zone of the country, in order to provide to the high conduction of the Force an operational, efficient and fast instrument to act in situations that they require of the immediate use of the force.

The FDR must have a high capacity of preparation and reaction that allows him to be used in the designated place. It will be instructed in the execution of basic tactical operations and complementary, for which it is properly equipped. It could be displaced in organic means of transport of the Force Army. In addition, it will be able to execute commando operations and special forces of high complexity.

Two commando companies will depend on her in organic form, along with an aerial shock battalion, a battalion of assault helicopters, and a slight reconnaissance company.

See also
Rapid Deployment Force (Argentina)
Special Air Service
Argentine Army

References
 Saorbats.com.ar news
 Saorbats.com.ar article
 Argentine Army article

Special forces of Argentina
Army units and formations of Argentina
Military units and formations established in 2005
2005 establishments in Argentina